The Royal College Curepipe (commonly known as RCC) is a public secondary school with high admission standards in Curepipe, Mauritius. Since 1791 it has been regarded as one of the most prestigious secondary schools in Mauritius.

In the past, it only admitted boys having achieved the best results at the Certificate of Primary Education (CPE) exams, based on national rankings. RCC has a tradition of Higher School Certificate (HSC) laureates who compete for state scholarships for tertiary studies abroad.

Following education system reforms and the introduction of nine year schooling, RCC was converted into an Academy in 2021. Thus becoming a co-education institution admitting the best performing male and female students of the National Certificate of Education.

History
The Royal College Curepipe is one of the oldest educational institutions of the Republic of Mauritius. The history of the Royal College Curepipe stretches back to 1791 when the predecessor of the Royal College of Curepipe, the Collège National also known as the Collège Colonial was founded in Port Louis. It was reserved for the children of the privileged classes of that area, and the college was known as École Centrale in 1800, before taking that of Lycée Colonial from 1803 to 1810 during the final years of the French rule in Mauritius. The Lycée Colonial was a boarding school and military training was introduced. For six months after the British conquest in 1810, the Lycée Colonial was used as a military hospital in Port Louis. In 1813 the name of the college was changed by a decree of Governor Sir Robert Farquhar, and became the Royal College. The main driver for relocating the college from Port-Louis to Curepipe was the deadly epidemic of 1899 which was most prevalent in the warmer and humid capital city. In 1912 the foundation stone of the present building in Curepipe was finally laid by Director of Public Works (Paul Le Juge de Segrais). The design was inspired by the Buckingham Palace of London. The present building was inaugurated in 1914.

Notable alumni 

 France Antelme - Broker, trader, World War II hero, Executed by Germans, Chevalier de la Légion d'Honneur
 Charles-Édouard Brown-Séquard - Medical Practitioner, Physiologist and neurologist, Professor at Royal de France 
 Dayendranath Burrenchobay - Laureate, Electrical Engineer, Knight of British Empire, Permanent Secretary, Governor General 
 Jayen Cuttaree - Scientist, lawyer, Minister of Labour, Housing and Industry 
 Maurice Curé - Laureate (1907), Medical Practitioner, Trade Unionist, founder of Mauritius Labour Party, Member of Legislative Council
 W. H. Lionel Cox - Laureate (1862), Chief Judge 
 Ajay Daby - Lawyer and Speaker of Parliament 
 Gaëtan Duval - Barrister, Lord Mayor (Port Louis), Deputy Prime Minister, Minister of Tourism, Knight of British Empire
 Aqiil Gopee - Laureate (2015), Writer
 Idrice Goumany - heroic medical doctor who managed a quarantine center during a smallpox epidemic
 Pravind Jugnauth - Prime Minister
 Jean Margéot - Bishop and first Mauritian Cardinal 
 Prem Nababsing - Deputy Prime Minister, Leader of Opposition and Ambassador in France
 Raman Osman - Governor-General
 Navin Ramgoolam - Medical practitioner, lawyer, former Prime Minister
 Seewoosagur Ramgoolam - Medical practitioner, first Prime Minister and Governor-General, Knight of British Empire
 Guy Rozemont - Trade unionist and member of Legislative Council
 Yiagadeesen Samy - Professor and school director
 Renganaden Seeneevassen - Lawyer and former minister
 Harry Tirvengadum - Managing Director of Air Mauritius

See also
 List of secondary schools in Mauritius 
 Education in Mauritius

References

External links
 Royal College Curepipe

Boys' schools in Mauritius
Educational institutions established in 1791
Secondary schools in Mauritius
1791 establishments in Africa
Curepipe